Sri Ramakrishna Vijayam is a Tamil language spiritual magazine published by Sri Ramakrishna Math, Chennai. The magazine has been published monthly since 1921.

This magazine is considered to be an ancient leading spiritual and cultural magazine in Tamil Nadu.

National Youth Day competition
As part of Swami Vivekananda birthday celebrations, Sri Ramakrishna Vijayam magazine organizes National Youth Day competition for the past 11 years for the students. In this competitions more than 10 lakh Students participated from nearly 3000 institutions last year and more than 12 lakh Students participated in the year 2014.

Short Story Competitions
Sri Ramakrishna Vijayam conducts short story competition from the year 2014 onwards to encourage the writers.

Short Story Competition 2015
For the year 2015, the short story competition has been announced and the last date to submit the Tamil short stories was declared to be 25 July 2015.

Short Story Competition 2014
In a short story competition conducted by this magazine nearly 1000 stories were submitted. The prizes were distributed on 29 August 2014.

See also
List of magazines by Ramakrishna Mission

Notes

References 
 http://www.thehindu.com/todays-paper/tp-features/tp-downtown/contests-camps-mark-anniversary-fest-of-swami-vivekananda/article4423514.ece
 http://www.thehindu.com/todays-paper/tp-national/tp-kerala/drawing-contest-for-students/article187904.ece
 http://ydc2010.blogspot.in/

Hindu magazines
Monthly magazines published in India
Magazines about spirituality
Magazines established in 1921
Ramakrishna Mission
Tamil-language magazines